Scumble may refer to:
 Scumbling, a glaze painting technique
Scumble, a novel by Ingrid Law
 Scumble, an alcoholic drink from Discworld made of apples. Well, mostly apples.